The British decimal one penny (1p) coin is a unit of currency and denomination of sterling coinage worth  of one pound. Its obverse featured the profile of Queen Elizabeth II since the coin's introduction on 15 February 1971, the day British currency was decimalised until her death on 8 September 2022. A new portrait featuring King Charles III was introduced on 30 September 2022, designed by Martin Jennings. Four different portraits of the Queen were used on the obverse; the last design by Jody Clark was introduced in 2015. The second and current reverse, designed by Matthew Dent, features a segment of the Royal Shield and was introduced in 2008. The penny is the lowest value coin (in real terms) ever to circulate in the United Kingdom.

The penny was originally minted from bronze, but since 1992 has been minted in copper-plated steel due to increasing copper prices.

There are an estimated 10.5 billion 1p coins in circulation as of 2016, with a total face value of around £105,000,000.

1p coins are legal tender only for amounts up to the sum of 20p when offered in repayment of a debt; however, the coin's legal tender status is not normally relevant for everyday transactions.

Etymology 
The word penny is derived from the Old English word penig, which itself comes from the proto-Germanic panninga. The correct plural form for multiple penny coins is pennies (e.g. fifty pennies). The correct term for monetary amounts of pennies greater than one penny is pence (e.g. one pound and twenty pence).

History 
Prior to 1971, the United Kingdom had been using the pounds, shillings, and pence currency system. Decimalisation was announced by Chancellor James Callaghan on 1 March 1966; one pound would be subdivided into 100 pence, instead of 240 pence as previously was the case.

This required new coins to be minted, to replace the pre-decimal ones. The original specification for the 1p coin was set out in the Decimal Currency Act 1969, which was replaced by the Currency Act 1971. Both mandated the weight of the coin to be 3.564 grams ±0.0750g, and 2.032 cm ±0.125 mm in diameter. Subsequently, the Currency Act 1983 allows for the standards of the 1p coin to be changed by royal proclamation.

The new 1p coins began production in December 1968 in the newly built Royal Mint facility in Llantrisant, South Wales. 1,521,666,250 1p coins were minted between 1968 and the end of 1971. On 15 February 1971, the United Kingdom officially switched to a decimal currency and the new coins entered circulation. The coins continue to be minted at this facility today.

Metallic composition 
The coin was originally minted in bronze (composition 97% copper, 2.5% zinc, 0.5% tin) between 1971 and September 1992. However, increasing world metal prices necessitated a change of composition. Since 1992, the coins are minted in steel and electroplated in copper, making them magnetic. Rising world prices for copper had caused the metal value of the pre-1992 copper 1p coin to exceed 1p (for example, in May 2006, the intrinsic metal value of a pre-1992 1p coin was about 1.5 pence). Melting coins is illegal in the United Kingdom and is punishable by a fine, or up to two years imprisonment.

Obverse designs 
To date, four different obverses have been used, all of which feature a portrait of Queen Elizabeth II. In the original design both sides of the coin are encircled by dots, a common feature on coins, known as beading.

Anticipation of a switch to a decimalised currency led to the commissioning of a new Royal Portrait by artist Arnold Machin, which was approved by the Queen in 1964. This featured the Queen wearing the 'Girls of Great Britain and Ireland' Tiara and was used until 1984. A modified form of this portrait has appeared on British Postage stamps since 1967.

Between 1985 and 1997 a portrait by Raphael Maklouf was used. The portrait is couped, and depicts the Queen wearing the George IV State Diadem. Unlike previous portraits, the Queen is wearing jewellery, earrings and a necklace. The initials of Maklouf  are shown below the neck of the Queen. His middle name, David, is included so that the mark is not confused with the initials of the Royal Mint.

In 1997, a competition to design the obverse of the 1997 Golden Wedding crown – a coin issued to celebrate the Queen's and Prince Philip's 50th wedding anniversary – was held. The standard of entry was so high that following this competition, the Royal Mint held another to design the new portrait. Ian Rank-Broadley won this competition, and his design was used between 1998 and 2015. The depiction of the Queen was seen as more realistic, with Rank Broadley himself saying "There is no need to flatter her. She is a 70-year-old woman with poise and bearing".In 2014, the Royal Mint again held a competition to design a new portrait. Designer Jody Clark won this competition, with a portrait of the Queen wearing the George IV State Diadem and the initials  feature under the neck of the Queen. The portrait was sketched without an official sitting, only using reference material for inspiration.

Reverse designs 
Despite no official government confirmation of a switch to decimalised currency, the Royal Mint began the design process for decimal coins in 1962. They invited the Royal Academy, the Royal Institute of British Architects, the Faculty of the Royal Designers for Industry and the Royal College of Art to nominate artists to design the hypothetical new coins. British sculptor Christopher Ironside won this competition, and his design was chosen to feature on the potential decimalised currency. His design for the 1p coin featured a Scottish theme, with a coin depicting a thistle above a Scottish flag inside a shield and a Scottish lion inside a shield. However, Chancellor James Callaghan's announcement that the United Kingdom would decimalise its currency included an open competition to find the new designs. Over 80 artists and 900 different designs were submitted. Ironside entered this competition with a further, different style of designs and won.

In August 2005 the Royal Mint launched a competition to find new reverse designs for all circulating coins apart from the £2 coin. The winner, announced in April 2008, was Matthew Dent, whose designs were gradually introduced into circulating British coinage from mid-2008. The designs for the 1p, 2p, 5p, 10p, 20p and 50p coins depict sections of the Royal Shield that form much of the whole shield when placed together. The entire shield was featured on the now-obsolete round £1 coin. The 1p coin depicts the left section between the first and third quarter of the shield, representing England and Northern Ireland.
The coin's obverse remains largely unchanged, but the beading (the ring of dots around the coin's circumference), which no longer features on the coin's reverse, has also been removed from the obverse.

Status

Legal tender 
1p coins are legal tender for amounts up to and including 20 pence. However, in the UK, "legal tender" has a very specific and narrow meaning which relates only to the repayment of debt to a creditor, not to everyday shopping or other transactions. Specifically, coins of particular denominations are said to be "legal tender" when a creditor must by law accept them in redemption of a debt. The term does not mean – as is often thought – that a shopkeeper has to accept a particular type of currency in payment. A shopkeeper is under no obligation to accept any specific type of payment, whether legal tender or not; conversely, they have the discretion to accept any payment type they wish.

Speculation on withdrawal 
The proposed withdrawal of the 1p coins has been subject of media speculation, such as in 2015 when the Chancellor of the Exchequer, George Osborne, proposed the withdrawal of the 1p coin. This was vetoed by Prime Minister David Cameron, because of the potential unpopularity with the public.

In March 2018, the Government launched a consultation on the future of payments in the British economy. One question focused on the denominational mix of coins, including 'dormant' denominations. This prompted speculation that the 1p and 2p coins could be withdrawn from circulation. Analysis from staff at the Bank of England concluded that fears about the withdrawal were 'unfounded' and that there would be no significant impact on prices if copper coins were scrapped, noting the sharp decline in usage of copper coins. It is estimated that 60% of copper coins are only spent once, before being removed from the cash cycle, as they are saved or binned. Approximately 8% of 1p coins are estimated to be thrown away entirely, requiring the annual minting of new 1p and 2p coins with a face value of £500m to replace coins falling out of circulation. Further, potential inflationary effects from the rounding of prices caused by scrapping the 1p would likely be minimal, given only 3% of payments by value are made in cash and card payments would continue to be made unrounded.

There was concern raised by some charities and businesses over the scrapping of 1p coins. Charities feared that the number of donations made in collection pots would fall and some business models could be severely impacted, for example traditional seaside arcades. However, in May 2019 Chancellor Phillip Hammond announced the outcome of a 2018 consultation, suggesting there were no plans to scrap copper coins and that he wanted the public to "have choice over how they spend their money". No 1p coins were minted in 2018, as the Treasury said that there were already enough in circulation.

Value
The penny has the lowest value in real terms of any coin in the history of the United Kingdom, since at least 1707. All previous low-value coins were withdrawn before their purchasing power fell below that of the penny. The purchasing power of previous lowest-value coins is:

Mintages

Machin portrait

Maklouf portrait

The composition was changed to copper-plated steel for the 1992 issue.

Rank-Broadley portrait

Clark portrait

Data taken from the Royal Mint mintage statistics. The latest estimate from the Royal Mint of the total number of 1p coins in circulation was in March 2016 and there were an estimated 10.5 billion 1p coins in circulation, with a total face value of around £105,000,000.

See also

 History of the British penny (1714–1901)
 History of the British penny (1901–1970)

References

External links
 Royal Mint - 1p coin
 Coins from United Kingdom / Coin Type: One Penny - Online Coin Club

Coins of the United Kingdom
Pennies
Currencies introduced in 1971
Decimalisation